The 20th Anniversary Series is a series of singles released by the American punk rock band The Bouncing Souls in 2009 to mark the twentieth year of the band's career. Over the course of the year, a total of 16 songs were released by the band's label Chunksaah Records as 7-inch singles and music downloads. The digital singles were released once a month, from January 1 to December 1, with 4 bonus songs being given out at the end of the year to those that purchased a subscription of the singles. The 7-inch EPs were released once every three months, and included 3 of the main songs and 1 bonus song on each. The 12 main songs were collected for a proper album, titled Ghosts on the Boardwalk.

Digital songs

7" EPs

Volume One
Volume One was released in March 2009.

Volume Two
Volume Two was released in June 2009.

A locked groove lies between tracks 3 and 4.

Volume Three
Volume Three was released in September 2009.

A locked groove lays Between tracks 3 and 4

Volume Four
Volume Four was released in December 2009.

A locked groove lays Between tracks 3 and 4

Credits
 Greg Attonito – vocals
 Pete Steinkopf – guitar
 Bryan Kienlen – bass
 Michael McDermott – drums

References

The Bouncing Souls EPs
2009 EPs
2009 singles
Album series
Chunksaah Records EPs
Albums produced by Ted Hutt